St. Dominic College of Asia also referred to by its acronym SDCA is a private coeducational basic and higher education institution in Bacoor, Cavite, Philippines. It was founded by Don Gregorio and Doña Dominga Andaman in 2003 and initially named St. Dominic College of Arts & Sciences.

History
The school traces its roots with the establishment of the St. Dominic Medical Center (SDMC) in 1991 by founders Don Gregorio and Doña Dominga Andaman. In 2003, 12 years after the realization of the hospital in Cavite, a school named St. Dominic College of Arts & Sciences was added to the hospital.

The college is the gift of the Andaman family to the community and the manifestation of their commitment to provide excellent but affordable education in Bacoor and neighboring communities.

Initially offering programs in Caregiving and BS Nursing in collaboration with the SDMC, St. Dominic has evolved into a full-fledged collegiate institution with four schools: School of Health Science Professions (SHSP), School of Arts, Sciences & Education (SASE), School of International Hospitality & Tourism Management (SIHTM), and School of Business & Computer Studies (SBCS).

In 2007, the College embarked in an ambitious long-term goal which aims to achieve a university status within the next 20 years. The plan for “The March Towards Excellence” was presented to the academic community and became the blueprint for development. Preparations towards accreditation of the academic programs was pursued in earnest. Rebranding strategies were also explored to make the College more relevant, responsive and congruent with the current trends and practices of a highly globalized educational system. In 2009, St. Dominic College of Arts & Sciences was officially renamed St. Dominic College of Asia.

In 2011, Dr. Marita A. Andaman-Rillo, eldest daughter of the founders, passed on the presidency of SDCA to the youngest Andaman son, Dr. Gregorio A. Andaman, Jr. Dr. Andaman, in his first year of presidency, launched the institution's battlecry “Revolutionizing Education”. Highlights of this include the launch the Basic Education Unit (Preschool, Elementary, and High School), and accreditation of Business Administration, Information Technology, Education, Psychology, Hospitality Management and Nursing programs by the Philippine Association of Colleges and Universities Commission on Accreditation (PACUCOA), both in 2012.

References

Universities and colleges in the Philippines
2003 establishments in the Philippines
Educational institutions established in 2003